In the mathematical field of descriptive set theory,  a subset of a Polish space  is an analytic set if it is a continuous image of a Polish space.

Definition 

There are several equivalent definitions of analytic set. The following conditions on a subspace A of a Polish space X are equivalent:
A is analytic.
A is empty or a continuous image of the Baire space ωω.
A is a Suslin space, in other words A is the image of a Polish space under a continuous mapping.
A is the continuous image of a Borel set in a Polish space.
A is a Suslin set, the image of the Suslin operation.
There is a Polish space  and a Borel set  such that  is the projection of  onto ; that is,
 
A is the projection of a closed set in the cartesian product of X with the Baire space.
A is the projection of a Gδ set in the cartesian product of X with the Cantor space 2ω.

Properties 

Analytic subsets of Polish spaces are closed under countable unions and intersections, continuous images, and inverse images.  
The complement of an analytic set need not be analytic. Suslin proved that if the complement of an analytic set is analytic then the set is Borel. (Conversely any Borel set is analytic and Borel sets are closed under complements.) Luzin proved more generally that any two disjoint analytic sets are separated by a Borel set: in other words there is a Borel set including one and disjoint from the other. This is sometimes called the "Luzin separability principle" (though it was implicit in the proof of Suslin's theorem).

Analytic sets are always Lebesgue measurable (indeed, universally measurable) and have the property of Baire and the perfect set property.

Projective hierarchy 

Analytic sets are also called  (see projective hierarchy). Note that the bold font in this symbol is not the Wikipedia convention, but rather is used distinctively from its lightface counterpart  (see analytical hierarchy).
The intersection  is the set of Borel sets.

See also
 Projection (measure theory)

References

 

N.N.  Lusin,   "Leçons sur les ensembles analytiques et leurs applications", Gauthier-Villars  (1930)

 Martin, Donald A.: Measurable cardinals and analytic games. Fundamenta Mathematicae 66 (1969/1970), p. 287-291.

Descriptive set theory